Panchmura Mahavidyalaya, established in 1965, is the first rural general college in Panchmura,  Taldangra Block, Bankura district, India. It offers undergraduate as well as post-graduate courses in arts, sciences, commerce and Physical Education. In total, it offers seventeen honours courses, three general degree courses and three post-graduate courses under CBCS. It is affiliated to Bankura University.

Departments

Science

Chemistry
Computer Science
Environment Science
Mathematics**
Physics

Arts and Commerce

Bengali** 
English
Sanskrit
Santali
Education
Geography
History**
Political Science
Philosophy
Physical Education
Economics
Accountancy

Post-graduate courses
 M.A. in Bengali
M.A. in History
M.Sc. in Mathematics

Accreditation
Panchmura Mahavidyalaya has been re-accredited by the National Assessment and Accreditation Council 
(NAAC) and awarded with B+ grade (CGPA 2.71) in the year of 2016. As per the NAAC PEER TEAM report, Panchmura Mahavidyalaya is one of the best rural college in India. The college is also recognized by the University Grants Commission (UGC) under 12B and 2f.

See also

References

External links
http://www.panchmuramahavidyalaya.org/

Colleges affiliated to Bankura University
Educational institutions established in 1965
Universities and colleges in Bankura district
1965 establishments in West Bengal